Benemérito de las Américas is a town and one of the 122 Municipalities of Chiapas, in southern Mexico. It covers an area of 979.2 km² and borders Guatemala.

As of 2010, the municipality had a total population of 17,282, up from 14,446 as of 2005.

As of 2010, the town of Benemérito de las Américas had a population of 7,259. Other than the town of Benemérito de las Américas, the municipality had 75 localities, the largest of which (with 2010 populations in parentheses) was: Flor de Cacao (1,655), classified as rural.

Geography
Situated in the Montañas del Oriente, a large part of its territory is mountainous.

References

Municipalities of Chiapas